This is a list of episodes for the Nickelodeon children's sitcom Clarissa Explains It All, which aired from 1991 to 1994. The series lasted five seasons, each producing thirteen episodes. Many of the episodes were shown in a different order than the order in which they were produced. Both the production numbers and the airing numbers are listed. A total of 65 episodes were produced. , only the first season is available on DVD.

Series overview

Episodes

Season 1 (1991)
The original Pilot was taped in September 1990; episodes 1-13 were taped from February to June 1991.

Season 2 (1992)
Episodes 14-30 were taped from January to June 1992.

Season 3 (1992–93)
Episodes 31-54 were taped from September 1992 to June 1993.

Season 4 (1993)

Season 5 (1993–94) 
Episodes 55-65 were taped from September to December 1993.

References

Lists of American children's television series episodes
Lists of American sitcom episodes
Lists of American teen comedy television series episodes
Lists of Nickelodeon television series episodes